Ignacio Luis Arcaya Rivero (Santa Ana de Coro, 3 May 1912 – Caracas, 4 September 1990), was a Venezuelan lawyer and politician. He was one of the signatories of the Puntofijo Pact on behalf of his party, the Democratic Republican Union (URD).

He was Minister of Foreign Affairs of Venezuela 1959–1960 and took part in the 7th Organization of American States conference on 16 August 1960, where against his President's wishes, he abstained on the issue of Cuban relations with the Organization of American States. He was President of the Venezuelan Chamber of Deputies 1962–1964, and became a Supreme Court of Venezuela judge in 1965.

He was the Prime Minister of Foreign Affairs until 28 August 1960.

Personal life and family
Ignacio Luis Arcaya had a son, Ignacio Arcaya (1939), who went on to become a career diplomat. In 2001 the National Assembly of Venezuela created an "Order of Merit Ignacio Luis Arcaya".

See also

List of Ministers of Foreign Affairs of Venezuela
 rulers.org

References

External links
 Luis Arcaya's Justification for his 1960 OAS vote (audio recording in MP3 format)
  Ramón José Velásquez, August 1952, Ignacio Luis Arcaya. La opinión de URD

  

 

1912 births
1990 deaths
People from Falcón
Democratic Republican Union politicians
Venezuelan Ministers of Foreign Affairs
Presidents of the Venezuelan Chamber of Deputies
Central University of Venezuela alumni